How to Meet a Perfect Neighbor is a 2007 South Korean television series starring Kim Seung-woo, Bae Doona, Park Si-hoo, Wang Ji-hye, Son Hyun-joo and Kim Sung-ryung. It aired on SBS from July 25 to September 27, 2007 on Wednesdays and Thursdays at 21:55 for 20 episodes.

The romantic comedy series was partially filmed in Cambodia, the first time for a Korean drama to be shot in that country.

Plot
Baek Soo-chan is a playboy infamous for manipulating women. After meeting Jung Yoon-hee and her older sister Mi-hee on vacation, he puts the moves on them as usual, but Yoon-hee sees right through him, and tries to keep him away from her naive sister. Fate draws them together again, however, when back in Korea, Soo-chan ends up living next door. Meanwhile, Yoon-hee begins working as secretary to Yoo Joon-seok, the new president of her company. Forced to come back and take over their family business when his father suddenly collapsed, Joon-seok shoulders the burdens of corporate responsibilities and of trying to please a father who has never shown him any affection. At first the perfectionist Joon-seok clashes with his quirky secretary, then gradually begins to fall for her. But Joon-seok's arranged marriage to Go Hye-mi, an heiress, is already being planned.

Cast

Main characters
Kim Seung-woo as Baek Soo-chan
Lee Ji-oh as young Baek Soo-chan
Bae Doona as Jung Yoon-hee 
Park Si-hoo as Yoo Joon-seok
Wang Ji-hye as Go Hye-mi
Son Hyun-joo as Yang Deok-gil
Shin Dong-woo as Yang Go-ni, Deok-gil's adopted son
Kim Sung-ryung as Jung Mi-hee, Yoon-hee's older sister
Ahn Sun-young as Oh Jung-sook
Park Kwang-jung as Mr. Park
Jung Eun-pyo as Mr. Choi

Supporting characters
Park Won-sook as Sun-woo, Yoon-hee and Mi-hee's mother
Jung Dong-hwan as Go Chang-shik, Hye-mi's father
Seo Kwon-soon as Song Young-ja, Hye-mi's mother
Kim Roi-ha as Detective Kang Yeok-gae
Kim Sung-tae as Detective Kim
Kwon Tae-won as Chief detective
Lee Won-jae as Byun Hee-sub
Kim Sun-hwa as Choi Bo-kyung, Hee-sub's wife
Han Ye-in as Byun Seon
Lee Byung-hyun as Byun Young
Kim Jung-hak as Cha Young-jae, J Corporation executive
Park Kwang-soo as Wee Dae-han, Jung-sook's husband
Kim Gil-ho as Yoo Man-ho, Joon-seok's father
Kim Seok-ok as Han Ok-geum, Joon-seok's mother
Park Yeon-ah as Ahn Ye-seul, Mi-hee's daughter
Cha Seo-won as Lei Kim
Kim Young-jin as Mina, Joon-seok's other secretary
Jang Hye-sook as Yeon Soo-yeon, Go-mi's mother
Kim Dong-gyun as Kim Dae-shik
Jo Han-na as Na Ha-ni
Kim Ye-ryeong as Dan Myung-hee
Kim Sa-rang
Pov Theavy (credited as Ka Cho)

Awards and nominations

International broadcast
It aired in Japan on cable channel KNTV from October 11 to December 14, 2010.

References

External links
 How to Meet a Perfect Neighbor official SBS website 
 

2007 South Korean television series debuts
2007 South Korean television series endings
Seoul Broadcasting System television dramas
Korean-language television shows
Films shot in Cambodia
South Korean romantic comedy television series